The following highways are numbered 104A:

United States
Maryland Route 104A
 New York State Route 104A
 County Route 104A (Suffolk County, New York)
 Vermont Route 104A

See also
List of highways numbered 104
List of highways numbered 104B